Ground bug or groundbug is a term that has not been used with a great deal of precision. It has been used to refer to the following Pentatomorpha:

the lygaeoid bugs (Lygaeoidea):
 Heterogastridae, for example Heterogaster urticae (Fabricius, 1775) - the "Nettle Ground Bug"
 Lygaeidae
 Piesmatidae
Others:
 Cydnidae more commonly known as the "burrowing bugs", and some as "ground pearls", but notably Microporus nigrita - "Black Ground Bug"
 Dipsocoridae, known as the "jumping ground bugs"

References